Comox Water Aerodrome  is located adjacent to Comox, British Columbia, Canada. The only air operations in the Comox Bay Marina are West Coast Air's three times a day service and Harbour Air's service to Vancouver.

Airlines and destinations

See also
 List of airports on Vancouver Island

References

Registered aerodromes in British Columbia
Comox Valley Regional District
Seaplane bases in British Columbia